C. vicina may refer to:
 Caerostris vicina, a spider species in the genus Caerostris
 Calliphora vicina, a bottle fly species
 Cheilosia vicina, a hoverfly species found in Great Britain

See also
 Vicina (disambiguation)